Hossein Kazerani (born April 13, 1947 in Andimeshk, Iran) is a retired Iranian football player.

He played most of his career for Pas Tehran. He was the captain and one of the key players of Pas winning the Iranian Takht Jamshid in 1977 and 1978.

He played for the Iran national football team and was a participant at the 1978 FIFA World Cup.

Kazerani ended his career in winter 1978/79, when the Iranian league was stopped due to the Iranian Revolution.

References

1947 births
Living people
People from Andimeshk
1978 FIFA World Cup players
Iran international footballers
Iranian footballers
Pas players
Association football defenders
Sportspeople from Khuzestan province